Finlex is a website that publishes information on judicial affairs of Finland. The website is owned by the Ministry of Justice of Finland and operated by Edita Publishing Oy. Finlex offers a collection of Finnish laws and decrees, judgments of Finnish courts, international treaties concluded by Finland and government bills proposed by the Finnish government. 

The website is free to use.

References

External links 
 

Finnish websites
Government-owned websites
Legal websites